The magnificent snake eel (Myrichthys magnifies), also known as the Hawaiian spotted snake eel, is an eel in the family Ophichthidae (worm/snake eels). It was described by Charles Conrad Abbott in 1860, originally under the genus Pisoodonophis. It is a marine, tropical eel which is known from the eastern central Pacific Ocean, including the Hawaiian Islands, the Leeward Islands, Johnston Island, and Midway Atoll.

References

magnificent snake-eel
Fish of Hawaii
magnificent snake-eel
magnificent snake-eel